Cardites is a genus of marine bivalve molluscs, in the family Carditidae.

Species
 Cardites antiquatus (Linnaeus, 1758)
 Cardites bicolor (Lamarck, 1819)
 Cardites canaliculatus (Reeve, 1843)
 Cardites cooperi (Melvill, 1909)
 Cardites crassicostatus (G. B. Sowerby I, 1825)
 Cardites cumingii (Deshayes, 1854)
 Cardites floridanus (Conrad, 1838)
 Cardites grayi (Dall, 1903)
 Cardites laticostatus (G. B. Sowerby I, 1833)
 Cardites micellus (Penna-Neme, 1971)
 Cardites nitidus (Reeve, 1843)
 Cardites ovalis (Reeve, 1843)
 Cardites rufus (Deshayes in Laborde & Linant, 1834)
 Cardites umbonatus (G. B. Sowerby III, 1904)

References
WoRMS

Carditidae
Bivalve genera